is a Japanese politician and the current Governor of Kyoto Prefecture.

Governor of Kyoto
Nishiwaki won the 2018 gubernatorial election, defeating his sole opponent Kazuhito Fukuyama, with 55.90% of the vote. In the race, Nishiwaki was backed by the ruling LDP and Komeito, as well as major opposition parties including the Democratic Party, Constitutional Democratic Party, and Kibō no Tō. After his election victory, Nishiwaki vowed to continue the policies of his predecessor, Keiji Yamada, who had served as governor for 16 years. Nishiwaki is considered to have strong relations with the central government, and is expected to use his Tokyo connections to influence national decisions on major projects involving the prefecture. Nishiwaki is also a former Reconstruction Agency vice minister and transport ministry official.
In April 2022, Nishiwaki was re-elected to a second term, receiving 66.8% of the vote.

References

Governors of Kyoto
Politicians from Kyoto Prefecture
University of Tokyo alumni
Living people
1955 births